The Republic of China Army (ROCA), previously known as the Chinese Nationalist Army or National Revolutionary Army and unofficially as the Taiwanese Army, is the largest branch of the Republic of China Armed Forces. An estimated 80% of the ROC Army is located on Taiwan, while the remainder are stationed on the Penghu, Kinmen, Matsu, Dongsha and Taiping Islands.

Since the Chinese Civil War, no armistice or peace treaty has ever been signed, so as the final line of defense against a possible invasion by the People's Liberation Army (PLA), the primary focus is on defense and counterattack against amphibious assault and urban warfare.

Organization

The ROC Army's current operational strength includes 3 armies, 5 corps. As of 2005, the Army's 35 brigades include 25 infantry brigades, 5 armoured brigades and 3 mechanized infantry brigades. All infantry brigades stood down and transferred to Reserve Command after 2005.

This update reflects the ROCA order of battle at the conclusion of the Jinjing Restructuring Plan in 2008.

A new type of unit called defense team is being introduced. These are formed by elements of de-activated brigades under each area defense command. The strength of a defense team may vary from one or more reinforced battalions, making it roughly equal to a regiment. The team CO is usually a full colonel.

In the event of war most of the high command would retreat to underground bunkers, tunnel complexes, and command posts.

Republic of China Army Command Headquarters 
The ROC Army CHQ  is headed by a 3-star general and is responsible for overall command of all ROC Army assets. Army GHQ is subordinate to the Chief of the General Staff (military), the Minister of National Defense (civilian) and the ROC President.
Internal Units: Personnel, Combat Readiness and Training, Logistics, Planning, Communications, Electronics and Information, General Affairs, Comptroller, Inspector General, Political Warfare.
 
601 Air Cavalry Brigade (original special force battalion assigned transferred back to 862nd Brigade)
602 Air Cavalry Brigade (original special force battalion assigned transferred back to 862nd Brigade)
603 Air Cavalry Brigade (this is a phantom unit, only exists on paper, no manpower, units, helicopters assigned)
101st Reconnaissance Battalion (better known as Sea Dragon Frogman, has a company station in Kinmen, Matsu, 3 in Penghu, and other frontline islands)
Special Forces Command In charge of 3 training centers
Army Airborne Training Center
Army Special Forces Training Center
Army Winter and Mountain Training Center
Special Forces Command (originally 862nd Special Operation Brigade)
Special Force 1st Battalion
Special Force 2nd Battalion
Special Force 3rd Battalion
Special Force 4th Battalion
Special Force 5th Battalion

 6th Army Corps: Northern Taiwan
  Guandu Area Command
  Lanyang Area Command
 269 Mechanized Infantry Brigade
 542 Armor Brigade
 584 Armor Brigade
 21 Artillery Command
 53 Engineer Group
 73 Signals Group
 33 Chemical Warfare Group

 8th Army Corps: Southern Taiwan
333 Mechanized Infantry Brigade
 564 Armor Brigade
 43 Artillery Command
 54 Engineer Group
 75 Signals Group
 39 Chemical Warfare Group

 10th Army Corps: Central Taiwan
234 Mechanized Infantry Brigade (will receive CM-32 "Clouded Leopard" wheeled IFV beginning of 2011)
  586 Armor Brigade
 58 Artillery Command
 52 Engineer Group
 36 Chemical Warfare Group
 74 Signals Group

 Hua-Tung Defense Command: Eastern Taiwan
 Hualien Defense Team
 Taitung Area Command

 Kinmen Defense Command
 Jindong (Kinmen East) Defense Team
 Jinshih (Kinmen West) Defense Team
 Shihyu Defense Team
 Artillery Group

 Penghu Defense Command
 1 Armored Battalion, 1 Armored Infantry Battalion, 1 Armored Cav Battalion, 1 mixed Artillery Battalion.

 Matsu Defense Command
 Nangan Defense Team
 Beigan Defense Team
 Juguang Defense Team

 Dongyin Area Command

Logistics Command
Education, Training and Doctrine Command
Republic of China Military Academy, Training & Command Schools, Chemical Warfare Corps, Engineering Corps, Arsenal Development.

  Armed Force Reserve Command
9 active infantry brigades, 24 Reserve brigades (Activated only in time of war)

ROC Army's former Army Missile Command was transferred to ROC Air Force in 2006.

Ranks

Commissioned officer ranks
The rank insignia of commissioned officers.

Other ranks
The rank insignia of non-commissioned officers and enlisted personnel.

Training
The Republic of China Military Academy, established in 1924, trains officers for the army in a four-year collegiate course of study, after which they graduate with an officer's commission and a bachelor's degree.

History

The Republic of China Army originated from Chinese National Revolutionary Army, which was founded by Sun Yat-sen's Kuomintang (KMT) in 1924, when the Whampoa Military Academy was established with Soviet military assistance. Whampoa Military Academy, which was presided by Chiang Kai-shek, was tasked with the objective of training a professional Chinese revolutionary army to unify China during the Warlord Era. It participated in the Northern Expedition, the Second Sino-Japanese War (during World War II) and the Chinese Civil War before withdrawing with the ROC government to Taiwan in 1949.

After 1949, the ROC Army has participated in combat operations on Kinmen and the Dachen Archipelago against the PLA in the Battle of Kuningtou, and in the First and Second Taiwan Strait Crisis. In addition to these major conflicts, ROCA commandos were regularly sent to raid the Fujian and Guangdong coasts. Until the 1970s, the stated mission of the Army was to retake the mainland from the People's Republic of China. Following the lifting of martial law in 1987 and the democratization of the 1990s, the mission of the ROC Army has been shifted to the defense of Taiwan, Penghu, Kinmen and Matsu from a PLA invasion.

With the reduction of the size of the ROC armed forces in recent years, the Army has endured the largest number of cutbacks as ROC military doctrine has begun to emphasize the importance of offshore engagement with the Navy and Air Force. Subsequent to this shift in emphasis, the ROC Navy and Air Force have taken precedence over the ROC Army in defense doctrine and weapons procurement. Recent short-term goals in the Army include acquisition and development of joint command and control systems, advanced attack helicopters and armored vehicles, Multiple Launch Rocket System and field air defense systems. The Army is also in the process of transitioning to an all volunteer force.

During the COVID-19 pandemic Army chemical warfare units were used to disinfect public areas and to do spot disinfections around known disease clusters. In January 2021 the 33rd Chemical Warfare Group was deployed to Taoyuan City to deal with a cluster of infections around a hospital there.

Equipment

From the 1990s onwards, the Republic of China Army launched several upgrade programmes to replace outdated equipment with more advanced weapons, also increasing its emphasis on forces that could be rapidly deployed and were suited for combat in Taiwan's heavily urbanized environment. Orders were placed with the United States for M60A3 Patton tanks, M109A5 "Paladin" howitzers and AH-1W SuperCobra attack helicopters, as well as updating existing equipment.

Along with the other ROC military branches, the ROC Army has extensive experience in the construction and utilization of tunnels and bases gained during the People's Republic of China's bombardments of Kinmen and Matsu during the Cold War and many facilities are rumoured to be located underground in undisclosed locations.

The U.S. Government announced on October 3, 2008 that it plans to sell $6.5 billion worth of arms to Taiwan ending the freeze of arms sales to Taiwan. Amongst other things, the plans include $2.532 billion worth of 30 AH-64D Apache Longbow Block III Attack helicopters with night-vision sensors, radar, 173 Stinger Block I air-to-air missiles and 1000 AGM-114L Hellfire missiles. and 182 Javelin missiles will also be available with 20 Javelin command launchers and is estimated to cost $47 million.

On January 29, 2010, US Government announced 5 notifications to US Congress for arms sales to Taiwan. Of the total 6.392 billion US dollars in the 5 announcements, ROC Army will receive 60 UH-60M and other related things for cost of 3.1 Billion.

Helicopters 

In July 2007 it was reported that the ROC Army would request the purchase of 30 AH-64E Apache Guardian attack helicopters from the US in the 2008 defence budget. In October 2015 it was announced that 9 AH-64E had been grounded due to oxidation of components in the helicopters' tail rotor gearboxes and comprehensive safety checks were made on all Apaches.  The 2008 defense budget also listed a request for 60 UH-60M Black Hawk helicopters as a partial replacement for the UH-1Hs currently in service.

Main battle tanks

As of 2019, the ROC army has 480 M60A3s, 450 CM11s (modified M48 turrets mated to M60 chassis), and 250 CM12s (CM-11 turrets mated to M48 hulls). The design and technology used in the tanks date back to the 1940s and 1950s, including their 105mm rifled gun and utilizing traditional steel armor plating rather than composite materials used in modern armored fighting vehicles. It is expected that the majority of the ROC Army’s armored units would continue to be equipped with legacy tanks in upgraded form after the army acquires the newer modern tanks. As of 2015, some CM11 tanks are observed to be upgraded with explosive reactive armor around the turret and hull.

In October 2017, Taiwan announced an upgrade program for 450 M60A3s consisting of replacing the main gun with a new 120 mm weapon, as well as upgrading the ballistics computer, turret hydraulics, and other systems. Testing and evaluation are expected to be completed in 2019 and application of new features to start in 2020. However, in July 2018 the Ministry of National Defense renewed its interest in acquiring Abrams, and had set aside US$990 million to purchase 108 M1A2s while modernization of existing M60A3s in service continues.

On June 7, 2019, Taiwan’s Ministry of National Defense confirmed that Taiwan has signed a $2 billion dollar weapons deal with the Trump administration, which includes a purchase of 108 M1A2T (M1A2C export variant for Taiwan) Abrams battle tanks. Taiwanese defense officials intend to use the M1A2T Abrams battle tank to replace its army's M60A3 and M48H CM11 tanks. On July 8, 2019, the U.S. State Department approved the sale of new M1A2T Abrams tanks to Taiwan despite criticism and protest of the deal from the People's Republic of China (PRC). The deal includes 122 M2 Mounted Machine Guns, 216 M240 machine guns, 14 M88A2 HERCULES vehicles, and 16 M1070A1 Heavy Equipment Transporters. General Dynamics Land Systems will build the tanks at Anniston Army Depot, Alabama, and at Joint Systems Manufacturing Center in Lima, Ohio. The final signing of the Letter of Offer and Acceptance (LOA) was confirmed on December 21, 2019. The tanks represent the first sale of new tanks to the ROC Army in decades from the US. Surplus M1A1 tanks were previously rejected by previous US administrations, including George W. Bush in 2001. Current ROC tanks include used M60A3 tanks and locally manufactured M48 tanks in which the initial variants were first produced between the 1950s and 1960s.

Some criticisms were made of these M1 Abrams purchases, some analysts expressed that Taiwan's terrain and some of its bridges and roads are unsuitable for the 60-tonne M1A2. However, Taiwan's current tanks have older 105-millimeter guns that may not be able to readily penetrate the frontal armor of modern People’s Liberation Army (PLA) Type 96 and Type 99 tanks, which can easily penetrate the Patton’s old-fashioned steel armor with their 125-millimeter guns. The M1A2T tank's 120-millimeter gun is capable of destroying PLA tanks without reliance on anti-tank missiles. Moreover, tanks can be used as mobile reserves for counterattacks against PLA beach landings, which was successful during the Battle of Guningtou. ROC Army Chief of Staff, Yang Hai-ming, said that China's best tank, the heavy Type 99 tank, would not be able to be transported in an amphibious invasion during a potential war with Taiwan and the PLA would have to rely on the much lighter 20-ton Type 63A tanks. Due to this logistics issue for the PLA there is less concern about the M1A2T tanks having to deal with China's most modern tanks during an amphibious invasion.

Infantry vehicles

CM-32 Yunpao, an 8x8 armoured personnel carrier locally manufactured, will replace ageing M113s and V-150 armoured vehicles. It is a modular vehicle platform capable of accepting various configurations for specific combat requirements. As of 2019, an IFV version of Yunpao armed with Orbital ATK 30mm Mk44 Bushmaster II cannons, CM-34, is planned for production. Production of a version with a 105-mm assault gun, which is modeled on that of the CM-11 Brave Tiger main battle tank, is also scheduled to be completed by 2023.

Air defense

Long and medium range air defense systems are operated by the Republic of China Air Force with the Army assuming much of the SHORAD mission. The most modern air defense system of the Army is the US-made Avenger.

The ROCA is in the process of fielding the Surface-to-Air TC-2 medium range air defense system. Development of a surface launched TC-2 began with the ROCN in 1994.

On June 7, 2019, Taiwan’s Ministry of National Defense confirmed that Taiwan has signed a $2 billion weapons deal with the Trump administration, which includes a purchase of "250 surface-to-air Stinger missile systems." Taiwan's ROC Army already has 2,223 Stinger missile systems.

Artillery
On September 23, 2019, former Defense Minister Yen De-fa confirmed the Republic of China Armed Forces has requested the purchase of M109A6 Paladin self-propelled howitzers from the United States. On August 4, 2021, the Biden administration approved a potential $750 million sale of 40 M109A6 self-propelled howitzers and other supporting equipment, including up to 1,698 kits for precision-guided munitions.

As of 2019, the ROC Army’s current artillery in service consists of M109A2 and M109A5 systems, 8 inch M110A2 self-propelled howitzers and 155mm M114 towed howitzers. These systems have exceeded their service life with the oldest being the M114, which has been in service for 68 years, while the youngest artillery system, the M109A5, has been in service for 21 years. The last artillery system that entered service is the M109A5s, which are ordered in 1996 and taken delivery in 1998.

Gallery

See also 
 Republic of China Army rank insignia
 Ministry of National Defense (Republic of China)
 Republic of China Armed Forces
 Republic of China Navy
 Republic of China Marine Corps
 Republic of China Air Force
 Republic of China Military Police
 Orders, decorations, and medals of the Republic of China
 Political status of Taiwan
 Santikhiri, a town in Thailand settled by remnants of the 93rd Division

References

External links
ROC Army webpage 

 
Military of Fujian